Simon Pokue was the Utshmau or chief of the Mushuau Innu First Nation in Newfoundland and Labrador, Canada from May 2004 until May 2007, when he was replaced by Utshmau Prote Poker.  He was elected as deputy chief in March 2010.

References

21st-century First Nations people
Indigenous leaders in Atlantic Canada
Innu people
Living people
Year of birth missing (living people)